Fuel is the EP of the band Fuel. The EP generally contains the same material as the band’s previous EP.

Track listing 

All songs by Carl Bell except where noted.

 "Gray" - 4:56
 "Blind" - 4:11
 "Forgiveness" - 3:40
 "Counter" - 4:10
 "What More Am I" - 3:47
 "Stripped Away" - * (The only circulating copy of this E.P has a tape dropout at 2:13, at the onset of the second verse. The uninterrupted recording would run approximately 3:20)
 "Happy" - 4:40
 "Alive & Dying" - 4:29 (Brett Scallions)

Personnel 

 Brett Scallions – lead vocals, rhythm guitar
 Carl Bell - lead guitar, backing vocals
 Erik Avakian – keyboards, backing vocals
 Jeff Abercrombie – bass 
 Jody Abbott – drums

Fuel Ep
Fuel (band) albums